Manufrance was the trade name of Manufacture Francaise d'Armes et Cycles de St.Etienne ("French Arms and Cycle Factory of St. Etienne"), a French mail order company which was situated in the manufacturing town of St. Etienne since 1888.

Products
The first French mail order company, it mainly specialised in shotguns (Robust, Falcor, Ideal, Simplex) and bicycles (Hirondelle). However, they covered other products, ranging from fishing rods to household items, such as wall clocks.

Most of the products sold by Manufrance were made by third-party manufacturers, then labeled and retailed by Manufrance.

Ownership
It was bought by Tavitian Jacques in 1988.

Users
An unlicensed Manufrance LaSalle 12-gauge shotgun, with a sawn-off barrel, was used by the perpetrator of the 2014 Sydney hostage crisis in Australia. Restrictions on illegal firearms were tightened as a result.

See also
Sears

References

External links
Official website

Retail companies of France
Cycle manufacturers of France
Companies based in Auvergne-Rhône-Alpes
Organizations based in Saint-Étienne